Harry Hibbott  (born 1859) was a Welsh international footballer goalkeeper. He was part of the Wales national football team between 1880 and 1885, playing 3 matches. He played his first match on 15 March 1880 against England and his last match on 23 March 1885 against Scotland.

See also
 List of Wales international footballers (alphabetical)

References

1859 births
Welsh footballers
Wales international footballers
Place of birth missing
Date of death missing
Association football goalkeepers